Thomas B. Berns (August 8, 1945 – February 19, 2018) was an American politician and civil engineer.

Berns was born in Chicago, Illinois. He graduated from University of Illinois with a degree in civil engineering. He lived in Urbana, Illinois with his wife and family. Berns was a civil engineer and surveyor. He taught surveying at the University of Illinois. Berns served in the Illinois House of Representatives from 2000 to 2003 and was a Republican. Berns died at Barnes-Jewish Hospital in St. Louis, Missouri from complications following heart surgery.

Notes

External links

1945 births
2018 deaths
Politicians from Chicago
People from Urbana, Illinois
Grainger College of Engineering alumni
University of Illinois Urbana-Champaign faculty
American civil engineers
American surveyors
Republican Party members of the Illinois House of Representatives